List of presidents of the Société entomologique de France:

 1832 Jean Guillaume Audinet-Serville (1775–1858)
 1833 Amédée Louis Michel le Peletier, comte de Saint-Fargeau (1770–1845)
 1834 Jean Victoire Audouin (1797–1841)
 1835 Charles Athanase Walckenaer (1771–1852)
 1836 Philogène Auguste Joseph Duponchel (1774–1846)
 1837 Jean Victoire Audouin (1797–1841) (second term)
 1838 Jean-Baptiste Alphonse Dechauffour de Boisduval (1799–1879)
 1839 Jules Pierre Rambur (1801–1870)
 1840 Pierre François Marie Auguste Dejean (1780–1845)
 1841 Charles Athanase Walckenaer (1771–1852) (second term)
 1842 Charles Nicholas Aubé (1802–1869)
 1843 Henri Milne-Edwards (1800–1885)
 1844 Ferdinando Arborio Gattinara di Breme (1807–1869)
 1845 Claude Charles Goureau (1790–1879)
 1846 Félix Édouard Guérin-Méneville (1799–1874)
 1847 Louis Jérôme Reiche (1799–1890)
 1848 Charles Jean-Baptiste Amyot (1799–1866)
 1849 Achille Guenée (1809–1880)
 1850 Louis Alexandre Auguste Chevrolat (1799–1884)
 1851 Louis Jérôme Reiche (1799–1890) (second term)
 1852 Claude Charles Goureau (1790–1879) (second term)
 1853 Jean-Baptiste Alphonse Dechauffour de Boisduval (1799–1879) (second term)
 1854 Léon Fairmaire (1820–1906)
 1855 Frédéric Jules Sichel (1802–1868)
 1856 Louis Jérôme Reiche (1799–1890) (third term)
 1857 Jean-Baptiste Eugène Bellier de la Chavignerie (1819–1888)
 1858 Jean-Baptiste Alphonse Dechauffour de Boisduval (1799–1879) (third term)
 1859 Jacques-Marie-Frangile Bigot (1818–1893)
 1860 Joseph Alexandre Laboulbène (1825–1898)
 1861 Victor Antoine Signoret (1816–1889)
 1862 Louis Alexandre Auguste Chevrolat (1799–1884) (second term)
 1863 Louis Jérôme Reiche (1799–1890) (fourth term)
 1864 Charles Nicholas Aubé (1802–1869) (second term)
 1865 Auguste Jean François Grenier (1814–1890)
 1866 Auguste Simon Paris (1794–1869)
 1867 Maurice Jean Auguste Girard (1822–1886)
 1868 Jean Étienne Berce (1803–1879)
 1869 Paul Gervais (1816–1879)
 1870 Joseph-Étienne Giraud (1808–1877)
 1871 Sylvain Auguste de Marseul (1812–1890)
 1872 Joseph Alexandre Laboulbène (1825–1898) (second term)
 1873 Charles N. F. Brisout de Barneville (1822–1893)
 1874 Charles Eugène Leprieur (1815–1892)
 1875 Eugène Simon (1848–1924)
 1876 Paul Mabille (1835–1923)
 1877 Louis Jérôme Reiche (1799–1890) (fifth term)
 1878 Paul Gervais (1816–1879) (second term)
 1879 Jean Pierre Mégnin (1828–1905)
 1880 Charles Eugène Leprieur (1815–1892) (second term)
 1881 Léon Marc Herminie Fairmaire (1820–1906) (second term)
 1882 Louis Jérôme Reiche (1799–1890) (sixth term)
 1883 Victor Antoine Signoret (1816–1889) (second term)
 1884 Édouard Lefèvre (1839–1894)
 1885 Émile Louis Ragonot (1843–1895)
 1886 Jules Bourgeois (1847–1911)
 1887 Eugène Simon (1848–1924) (second term)
 1888 Jules Künckel d'Herculais (1843–1918)
 1889 Joseph Alexandre Laboulbène (1825–1898) (second term)
 1890 Paul Mabille (1835–1923) (second term)
 1891 Antoine Henri Grouvelle (1843–1917)
 1892 Camille Jourdheuille (1830–1909)
 1893 Édouard Lefèvre (1839–1894) (second term)
 1894 Félix de Vuillefroy-Cassini (1841–1918)
 1895 Émile Louis Ragonot (1843–1895) (second term)
 1896 Alfred Giard (1846–1908)
 1897 Antoine Henri Grouvelle (1843–1917) (second term)
 1898 Louis-Eugène Bouvier (1856–1944)
 1899 Charles A. Alluaud (1861–1949)
 1900 Alfred Giard (1846–1908) (second term)
 1901 Eugène Simon (1848–1924) (third term)
 1902 Henri W. Brölemann (1860–1933)
 1903 Louis-Félix Henneguy (1850–1928)
 1904 Paul Mabille (1835–1923) (third term)
 1905 Albert Leveillé (died 1911)
 1906 Paul Marchal (1862–1942)
 1907 Pierre Lesne (1871–1949)
 1908 Joseph de Joannis (1864–1932)
 1909 Jules Künckel d'Herculais (1843–1918) (second term)
 1910 Maurice Maindron (1857–1911)
 1911 Armand Janet
 1912 Jules de Gaulle (1850–1922)
 1913 Charles Joseph Sainte-Claire Deville (1814–1876)
 1914 Charles A. Alluaud (1861–1949) (second term)
 1915 Étienne Rabaud (1868–1956)
 1916 Joseph de Joannis (1864–1932) (second term)
 1917 Henri Jean Desbordes (1856–1940)
 1918 Paul Marchal (1862–1942) (second term)
 1919 E. Moreau
 1920 Julien Achard (1881–1925)
 1921 Jacques M.R. Surcouf (1873–1934)
 1922 Auguste Eugène Méquignon (1875–1958)
 1923 Étienne Rabaud (1868–1956) (second term)
 1924 François Picard (1879–1939)
 1925 Raymond Peschet (1880–1940)
 1926 Louis Sémichon
 1927 Émile Roubaud (1882–1962)
 1928 Louis Dupont
 1929 Pierre Marié
 1930 Paul Vayssière (1889–1984)
 1931 Constantin Dumont (1849–1932)
 1932 René Gabriel Jeannel (1879–1965)
 1933 L.H. Berthet
 1934 Louis Fage (1883–1964)
 1935 Victor Laboissière (1875–1942)
 1936 Charles Fagniez
 1937 Victor Laboissière (1875–1942) (second term)
 1938 Pierre Lesne (1871–1949)
 1939 André Théry (1864–1947)
 1940 J. de Lépiney
 1941 Pierre-Paul Grassé (1895–1985)
 1942 André Maublanc (1880–1958)
 1943 Henri Stempffer (1894–1978)
 1944 Lucien Berland (1888–1962)
 1945 Émile Licent (1876–1952)
 1946 Lucien Marceron (1892–1966)
 1947 R. Poutiers
 1948 Alfred Balachowsky (1901–1983)
 1949 S. Lemarchand
 1950 J. Balazuc
 1951 Pierre Lepesme
 1952 Robert-Philippe Dollfus
 1953 Claude Herbulot (1908–2006)
 1954 G. Pécoud (1883–1970)
 1955 Paul Pesson
 1956 Gaston Ruter (1898–1979)
 1957 Hervé de Toulgoët (1911–2009)
 1958 Emile Rivalier (1892–1979)
 1959 A. Roudier
 1960 Guy Colas
 1961 H. Bertrand (1892–1978)
 1962 Général P. Dispons
 1963 Germaine Cousin
 1964 P. Rebillard
 1965 Henri Henrot
 1966 J. Carayon
 1967 Henri Oberthür
 1968 André Villiers (1915–1983)
 1969 J. Jarrige (1904–1975)
 1970 A. Badonnel
 1971 B. Possompès
 1972 Claude Lemaire (1921–2004)
 1973 C. Rungs
 1974 E. Biliotti
 1975 J. Péricart
 1976 J. R. Le Berre
 1977 Jacques Nègre (1908–1988)
 1978 F. Pierre (1918–1990)
 1979 A. Vachon (died 1983)
 1980 J. Bergerard
 1981 Adrien Roudier
 1982 Renaud Paulian (1913–2003)
 1983 Jacques Chassain
 1984 Claude Caussanel
 1985 J. Péricart
 1986 J. Bergerard
 1987–1988: Paul Pesson (1911–1989)
 1989–1990: Armand Matocq
 1991–1992: Jacques Pierre
 1993–1994: Gérhard H. Perrault
 1995–1996: Jean-Louis Dommanget
 1997–1998: G. H. Perrault
 1999–2000: Claude Girard
 2001–2002: Imré Foldi
 2003: Jacques Forel
 2004–2005: Thierry Deuve
 2006–2007: Yves Gomy
 2008–2009: Roger Roy
 2010–2011: Philippe Magnien
 2012–2013: Daniel Rougon
 2014–2015: Hubert Piguet
 2016–2017: Philippe Ponel
 2018: Laurent Péru
 2019–2020: Philippe Le Gall
 2021–2022: Bernard Moncoutier

References 

Presidents of the Societe entomologique de France

Lists of presidents of organizations